Augustus Frank Justice Ford (12 September 1858 – 20 May 1931) was an English first-class cricketer active 1878–86 who played for Middlesex. He was born in Paddington; died in Marylebone.

References

1858 births
1931 deaths
English cricketers
Middlesex cricketers
Cambridge University cricketers
Marylebone Cricket Club cricketers
North v South cricketers